King of Gamblers is a 1937 American low-budget gangster film directed by Robert Florey. Akim Tamiroff takes an unusual featured role as a slot-machine racketeer whose bombing of an uncooperative barber shop leads to a murder charge. (The film was also known as Czar of the Slot Machines.)

By her own account, silent film star Louise Brooks played a bit part in the film for  Florey, who "specialised in giving jobs to destitute and sufficiently grateful actresses", referring both to herself and to Evelyn Brent. However, Brooks does not appear in the completed film.

Cast
 Claire Trevor as Dixie Moore
 Lloyd Nolan as Jim Adams
 Akim Tamiroff as Steve Kalkas
 Buster Crabbe as Eddie
 Helen Burgess as Jackie Nolan
 Porter Hall as George Kramer
 Barlowe Borland as Mr. Parker
 Purnell Pratt as Strohm
 Colin Tapley as Joe
 Paul Fix as Charlie
 Cecil Cunningham as Big Edna
 Fay Holden as Nurse
 Evelyn Brent as Cora

References

External links 

1937 films
Films directed by Robert Florey
Paramount Pictures films
1937 crime films
American black-and-white films
American crime films
1930s American films
1930s English-language films